Les Gray (4 October 1921 – 1 June 2008) was an  Australian rules footballer who played with St Kilda in the Victorian Football League (VFL).

Notes

External links 

1921 births
2008 deaths
Australian rules footballers from Victoria (Australia)
St Kilda Football Club players
Oakleigh Football Club players